Stepan Klochurak was the Prime Minister of the short lived Hutsul Republic in 1919. In 1939, in the same general area, he was the Minister of Defense of Carpatho-Ukraine.

Memoirs

References

1895 births
1980 deaths
People from Zakarpattia Oblast
People from the Kingdom of Hungary
Ukrainian Austro-Hungarians
Hutsuls
Ukrainian politicians before 1991
Czechoslovak politicians
Ukrainian nationalists
West Ukrainian People's Republic people